Milstead is an unincorporated community and census-designated place (CDP) in Rockdale County, Georgia, United States. It is bordered to the south by the city of Conyers, the county seat, and to the north by the Yellow River.

Milstead was first listed as a CDP prior to the 2020 census with a population of 628.

Demographics

2020 census

Note: the US Census treats Hispanic/Latino as an ethnic category. This table excludes Latinos from the racial categories and assigns them to a separate category. Hispanics/Latinos can be of any race.

References 

Census-designated places in Rockdale County, Georgia